Wignick Island is an uninhabited island within the Arctic Archipelago in the Kitikmeot Region, Nunavut. It is located in Bathurst Inlet. Other islands in the vicinity include Quadyuk Island and North Quadyuk Island.

References 

Islands of Bathurst Inlet
Uninhabited islands of Kitikmeot Region